Dirt track may refer to:
 A kind of race track
 A dirt road
 A trail

See also
 Dirt track racing
 Track racing